The Berlin–Dresden railway is a double track, electrified main line railway in the German states of Berlin, Brandenburg and Saxony, which was originally built and operated by the Berlin-Dresden Railway Company (Berlin-Dresdener Eisenbahn-Gesellschaft). It runs from Berlin through the southern Teltow countryside and then between Lower Lusatia and Fläming Heath through Elsterwerda and the Großenhainer Pflege countryside to Dresden.

History

Up to 1945
In 1848 the Berlin-Anhalt Railway Company opened the Jüterbog–Röderau line, connecting with the Leipzig–Dresden line and creating the first direct rail link between Berlin and Dresden.
In 1872 the Berlin-Dresden Railway Company was founded to build a competing a line via Elsterwerda that was  shorter. This route was opened on 17 June 1875. Long-distance traffic between Berlin and Dresden was divided between the two routes until the end of World War II.

1 October 1877 management of the line was taken over by Prussian state railways. On 24 January 1887 Saxony and Prussia contracted a treaty, under which ownership of the company passed to Prussia from 1 April 1887. This treaty also provided that the Elsterwerda–Dresden section was resold to the Saxon government on 1 April 1888, when it became part of the Royal Saxon State Railways.

At both ends of the line new stations were built, the Dresdner Bahnhof (Dresden station) in Berlin and Berliner Bahnhof (Berlin station) in Dresden. Both stations were used only briefly. In 1882 the Dresden station in Berlin (located on the site of the present-day Gleisdreieck U-Bahn station and the former postal station in Luckenwalder Strasse) was closed for passenger traffic. The line’s Berlin terminus was moved a little further north to the Anhalter Bahnhof (Anhalt station). A little later, the Berlin train station in Dresden was abandoned as part of the redevelopment of the Dresden railway node. In its place the Dresden-Friedrichstadt station was built, which has been used since 1894 for freight and regional services. Since that time, long distance services have turned off towards Radebeul-Zitzschewig on the Leipzig–Dresden line and Dresden-Neustadt to Dresden Hauptbahnhof. In contrast, freight trains to and from Leipzig use the Berlin–Dresden railway from Radebeul-Naundorf station to Friedrichstadt.

From 1875 until World War I the Prussian military railway ran parallel with the line from Berlin to Zossen. This line was dismantled in 1919. A new railway bridge on the Dresden line had to be built south of the S-Bahn station at Mariendorf (now Attilastraße) as a result of the construction of the Teltow canal in 1905.

In 1936 a high-speed express service commenced between Berlin and Dresden using the Henschel-Wegmann Train, taking 100 minutes.
The Berlin suburb train operations were electrified in 1939 and 1940. Berlin S-Bahn services commenced on 15 May 1939 between Priesterweg and Mahlow and on 6 October 1940 the S-Bahn was extended to Rangsdorf. The S-Bahn shared tracks in southern Berlin with long-distance passenger and freight trains. At the end of the 1930s work began on the new track to separate the S-Bahn and long-distance tracks, but by the beginning of the Second World War this work was not completed.

In April 1945, S-Bahn services ceased as a result of the war.

Reopening in 1945 
After the end of the war in 1945 the railway line was seriously damaged by the allies. In addition the bridges over the Teltow Canal in Berlin were blown up in the last days of the war by the German army. Later the line’s second track was dismantled to provide reparations to the Soviet Union. Only two tracks have been restored on these bridges. Services resumed between August and October 1945. Between Mariendorf and Marienfelde stations S-Bahn services and the remaining passenger and freight services ran on a common two-track section. Between Rangsdorf and Wünsdorf steam suburban trains operated to connect with the S-Bahn.

The division of Germany and Berlin also affected the traffic on the Berlin-Dresden line. In 1951, a connecting curve was built in an easterly direction from the line linking with the newly established Berlin outer ring. Long-distance trains from Dresden used it to avoid West Berlin. The terminal stations on West Berlin territory were closed, including the Anhalt station on 18 May 1952. Afterwards regional services used the outer ring to reach the East Berlin stations of Schöneweide, Lichtenberg or Ostbahnhof. Only the S-Bahn service from Rangsdorf ran over the border into West Berlin. Freight services continued to operate in West Berlin from the north to Marienfelde station (including to the gas works at Mariendorf and the Daimler factory at Marienfelde). The remaining long-distance tracks south of Marienfelde station was partially dismantled or became overgrown in the following decades.

After the building of the Berlin Wall on 13 August 1961, S-Bahn-operations between Lichtenrade and Mahlow were abandoned.  S-Bahn services initially operated a shuttle service between Mahlow and Rangsdorf, but this was discontinued on 9 October 1961 due to the lack of repair and storage facilities. Commuter trains from Wünsdorf ran to Schönefeld Airport station. From 1962 there was an S-Bahn service to Berlin. As of 26 May 1963 a shuttle train consisting of a class VT 2.09 railbus (known as the "piglet taxi") ran between Mahlow and Blankenfelde, connecting to services on the outer ring.

Upgrading of the line since the 1960s 
The low capacity of the single-track line and the poor condition of the track had long caused operational problems. The high density of freight on the line left only a small number of paths for fast passenger trains. An improvement occurred in 1972, after the whole line was duplicated. The stations from Baruth/Mark to Brenitz-Sonnewalde were converted for high speed with the relocation of platforms onto sidings.
The section from Dresden-Friedrichstadt to Radebeul-Naundorf was electrified on 28 September 1969. The rest of the line to the Berlin outer ring including the two connecting curves on the ring was electrified in several sections between 1979 and 1983. Services on the West Berlin section of the S-Bahn between Marienfelde and Lichtenrade, which had been closed in September 1980 following a strike, were restored in 1988. The line had only one track.

The line had a dense express traffic to Czechoslovakia, Hungary, Romania and Austria and to southern East Germany. Regional services ran every hour between Schönefeld and Wünsdorf, some continued to Baruth. Further south local traffic was low: between Baruth and Elsterwerda for many years there were only four passenger trains a day. South of Elsterwerda there were a few more services.

Upgrades since 1990 
After the fall of the Berlin Wall a single-track of the S-Bahn was rebuilt between Lichtenrade and Mahlow and services were restored to Blankenfelde on 31 August 1992. Occasionally freight trains ran on the S-Bahn tracks to the south, including trains carrying refuse. Between January and May 1992 extensive renovation was carried out on the track. This reduced long-distance journey times by 35 minutes. In August 2019, the travel time between Dresden-Neustadt and Berlin-Südkreuz was 102 minutes.

Further upgrading of the line 

In addition, the Böhla–Neucoswig section of the line is being upgraded as part of German Unity Transport Project No 9, which covers the upgrading of the Leipzig–Dresden line. The Weissig–Böhla connecting curve will in future link the Leipzig–Dresden line to Böhla so that long-distance passenger and fast freight trains can use the Berlin–Dresden line to and from Leipzig, allowing the better separation of traffic at the Dresden railway node.

Restoration of the Dresden railway in Berlin 

Since May 2006, most long-distance and regional trains operating on the line run from the new Berlin Hauptbahnhof by the new line under the Tiergarten and join the old Anhalt line from Anhalt station to Dresden near Gleisdreieck. Until the restoration of the line between  Südkreuz and the southern outer ring, trains run from near Priesterweg S-Bahn station on a detour along the Anhalt line to a recently built connecting curve at Genshagener Berlin on to the outer ring. At Glasower Damm junction trains leave the outer ring and rejoin the Dresden railway at the  mark.

Since 2019 direct connection of the Berlin–Dresden line between the southern outer ring at Blankenfelde and Südkreuz is being restored. This line is important in the development of a fast connection to Berlin-Brandenburg International Airport for Airport Express trains serving Berlin Brandenburg airport train station. It is estimated that the new section will shorten travel time for passenger trains by about ten minutes.

Notes

References

External links 
 

Railway lines in Brandenburg
Railway lines in Berlin
Railway lines in Saxony
Standard gauge railways in Germany